The music of Israel is a combination of Jewish and non-Jewish music traditions that have come together over the course of a century to create a distinctive musical culture. For almost 150 years, musicians have sought original stylistic elements that would define the emerging national spirit. Early music in Israel have start since ancient times of Bible(History of music in the biblical period). 
   In addition to creating an Israeli style and sound, Israel's musicians have made significant contributions to classical, jazz, pop rock and other international music genres. Since the 1970s, there has been a flowering of musical diversity, with Israeli rock, folk and jazz musicians creating and performing extensively, both locally and abroad. Many of the world's top classical musicians are Israelis or Israeli expatriates. The works of Israeli classical composers have been performed by leading orchestras worldwide.

Music in Israel is an integral part of national identity. Beginning in the days of the pioneers, Hebrew songs and public singalongs (Shira beTsibur) were encouraged and supported by the establishment. "Public singalongs were a common pastime [of the early settlers], and were for them a force in defining their identity", wrote Nathan Shahar. This view of music as nation-building continues to this day. "We are in the midst of creating a culture", wrote Nahum Heyman, one of Israel's leading music composers and music historians. Jewish immigrants from Europe, Asia, the Middle East and elsewhere brought with them their musical traditions, melding and molding them into a new Israeli sound.

Global influences

Russian folk music

Many of the Zionist immigrants who arrived before 1935 came from Russia.  They brought with them the folk tunes and musical style of Russia. Songs in the early days were often contrafacta – Russian folk tunes with translated or new lyrics in Hebrew.  An example is Shir Hamitpachat, ("Song of the Kerchief") a Polish song by Jerzy Petersburski (Niebieska chusteczka, Sinij Platochek, синий платочек) with Hebrew lyrics by the Israeli poet and lyricist Nathan Alterman. These Russian-style tunes are generally in a minor key, and often accompanied by accordion, or by guitar imitating the sound of the balalaika.

Eastern European klezmer music

Klezmer music was also brought to the country by the immigrants of the early 20th century. Many Hassidic and klezmer melodies found their way into the canon of Israeli folk music, with lyrics translated from the Yiddish, or new Hebrew words. An example is Numi Numi (Sleep My Child), a song composed by Joel Engel based on a Hassidic lullaby, with lyrics by Yehiel Heilprin

Rock and pop music 

Since the late 1960s, Israeli popular music has been deeply influenced by mainstream pop and rock music from the United Kingdom and the U.S. Iconic Israeli 1970s rock groups such as Kaveret and Tamouz and singer-songwriters such as Shalom Hanoch and Miki Gavrielov, laid the foundations for what is today the rich and varied scene of Israeli pop and rock. Mixing Western pop and rock with the original style of Israeli folk music and Oriental Jewish music, particularly Yemenite, Greek and Andalusian-Moroccan, creates together the original and unique sound of Israeli music today.

Among the leaders in Israeli music are singers and bands such as: Etti Ankri, David D'Or, Aviv Gefen, Rita, Shlomo Artzi, HaYehudim, Ivri Lider, and Dana International.  Both Lider and International often sing songs dealing with their own sexual preferences – Lider's song "Jesse" is about unrequited homosexual love, and International, a transsexual, began her singing career as a drag queen. Other pop stars include Ninet Tayeb, Harel Skaat and Shiri Maimon – all winners of the Israeli talent search TV show Kokhav Nolad ("A Star is Born", the Israeli version of "Pop Idol").  Maimon represented Israel in the Eurovision Song Contest 2005, and reached top 4 out of over 25 countries, with her ballad "Hasheket Shenishar" ("The Silence That Remains").

In 2013, there were many collaborations between older Israeli singers and young artists.  Corinne Elal, Arik Einstein, Chava Alberstein, Yehoram Gaon, Allon Olearchik and Shlomo Gronich all paired up with musicians of the younger generation. Most recently, Netta Barzilai won Eurovision's singing competition, showcasing her diverse approach to songwriting and performance.

Middle Eastern music

The earliest composers of Hebrew folk music were influenced by the sounds of the local Arab music. Later, Oriental musical traditions were brought by Jewish immigrants from other Middle Eastern countries  – from Morocco, Yemen, Iraq, Egypt and elsewhere.  These immigrants developed an eclectic Mediterranean style called "Muzika Mizrahit" (Oriental music), which became increasingly popular in the early 1960s and was later influenced by popular Greek music (Rembetiko), whilst at the same time, influencing Israeli pop and rock.  Muzika Mizrahit combines eastern and western elements: the ensemble includes Middle Eastern instruments, such as the oud, the kanun, the Eastern violin, the darbouka and the Greek bouzouki, alongside electric and acoustic guitars, pianos and other western instruments. The singers add Arab-style melismatic ornamentation, (silsulim in Hebrew), and often sing in a nasal tone, similar to Arab music. The melodies are often modal, swinging between major and minor, and diction is guttural.  While Arab music is traditionally homophonic, based on melodic patterns called maqamat, Muzika Mizrahit is closer to Greek music, has harmonic accompaniment and usually uses a western, 12-tone scale.

The distinctive east–west sonorities of Muzika Mizrahit have left their imprint on Israeli popular music. An example is Zohar Argov's HaPerach BeGani ("The flower in my garden"), with lyrics by Avihu Medina and music by Medina and Moshe Ben Mosh.

Jewish Yemenite music

The music of Yemenite Jews was particularly influential in the development of Israeli music because it was seen by early Zionists as a link to their biblical roots.  The music of the ancient Hebrews, wrote the musicologist A.Z. Idelsohn, "is preserved in memory and practice in various Jewish centers ... Yemen, in South Arabia, [is] a community that lived practically in seclusion for thirteen hundred years..." There was a Yemenite Jewish community in Palestine before 1900, and the European settlers who came in the 1920s were enamored of the Yemenite style.  Many of the early Zionist folk songs were westernized versions of Yemenite songs.  In the 1930s and 1940s, Yemenite singer Bracha Zefira researched and recorded many Yemenite songs, and also sang original compositions in the Yemenite style.  An example is the song "Shtu HaAdarim" (Drink, the Flock), with words by Alexander Penn and music by Nahum Nardi.

Following Operation On Wings of Eagles, Aharon Amram became "the first to record Yemenite music using instruments from outside its tradition," overcoming initial opposition by Israeli-Yemenite radio broadcasters who traditionally regarded authentic Yemenite music as being with nothing more than tin and didn't want to air his performances. Among the instruments he accompanied his traditional Yemenite singing with were "guitar, violin, qanoun [a kind of zither], trumpet, trombone and percussion instruments." Yemenite music reached a world audience in the 1980s as a result of the efforts of Israeli singer Ofra Haza, whose album Yemenite Songs became an international hit with world music fans. Haza grew up in a traditional Yemenite family who lived in Tel Aviv's poor Hatikva neighborhood. She became famous for singing pop music, but later in her career became something of a cultural ambassador for her community, both in Israel and internationally. Several of her most famous tracks, such as "Im Nin'alu", were reworkings of traditional Yemenite songs, many composed by Rabbi Shalom Shabazi, a medieval poet and mystic whose spiritual and artistic achievements are universally revered in the Yemenite community. Shabazi's poetry dealt with both religious and secular themes, giving Yemenite music a wider lyrical range than many other forms of traditional Jewish music, which tend to be liturgical in nature.

Greek, Latin American, Ethiopian and other influences

Greek-style bouzouki music became increasingly popular in the early 1960s. Aris San, a non-Jewish Greek singer who moved to Israel and became an Israeli citizen, was the driving spirit behind this trend. One of Aris San's hit songs was "Sigal" (lyrics by Yovav Katz). Aris San, who worked at the Zorba club in Jaffa, owned and opened by Shlomo Bachramov wrote songs for Aliza Azikri (Bahayim hakol over, Yesh ahava ata omer), that effectively broke down the barriers between Israeli song and the world of Greek and Mizrahi music. The songs of the iconic Greek singer Stelios Kazantzidis were translated into Hebrew and performed by the country's leading singers. Being Greek, Yehuda Poliker has many songs that use bouzouki.

A number of young musicians traveled to South America in the late 1960s, and brought back Latin rhythms and sonorities which became a force in popular music through the 1970s. An example is the song "Noah" by Matti Caspi.

The American folk movement of the 1960s and 1970s influenced the Israeli national style, and Israeli folksingers, among them Chava Alberstein – patterned themselves after Judy Collins and Joni Mitchell. In the 1960s, guitar duos such as the Dudaim and the Parvarim performed not only "canonical" Israeli songs, but also Hebrew versions of American and British folk songs.

The 1970s saw the growth of a new eclecticism in Israeli music.  Rock, jazz and other genres began to strike roots, influenced by worldwide trends but also adding elements that were uniquely Israeli.

The Idan Raichel Project, a successful pop/ethnic group formed in the 2000s, merges Ethiopian and Western music. Raichel collaborated with Ethiopian Jewish immigrants to produce a unique sound, combining Electronic music sounds, classic piano, electric guitar, traditional drums and Ethiopian-style singing, with its complex quartertone scales and rhythms. The songs are sung in a combination of Hebrew and Amharic.

Land of Israel style

The "Shirei Eretz Yisrael" – "Songs of the Land of Israel" or "Zemer ivri". These songs were composed from 1920 to the mid-1970s.

The early Zionist settlers originated this eclectic style. Beginning in the early 1920s, the pioneers sought to create a new style of music that would strengthen ties with their Hebrew roots and distinguish them from Diaspora Jewry and its perceived weakness. Elements were borrowed a bit from Arabic music and, to a lesser extent, traditional Yemenite and eastern Jewish music. The songs were often homophonic, modal, and limited in range. Examples of this emerging style include "Shedemati" by Yedidia Admon, and "Shibbolet Basadeh" by Matityahu Shelem.

The songs have certain identifying musical characteristics:

 Use of minor keys. The canonical songs are almost universally in minor.  Songs based in the Russian or klezmer traditions normally use the harmonic minor (that is, with an elevated seventh), while songs in the New Hebrew style use natural minor, often with a diminished second leading to the tonic. Songs in this style are also sometimes modal, or semimodal, ending on the dominant rather than the tonic. An example is Moshe, by Emmanuel Zamir, sung by Yaffa Yarkoni.

 Horah, Temani, Atari and other dance rhythms.  These dance rhythms often have strong offbeats and asymmetric meters.  They accompany popular Israeli folk dances.  An example of a debka rhythm is At Adama, based on a Bedouin melody, and sung by Ran Eliran.
 Use of the darbuka, the tambourine and other instruments associated with middle eastern music.

 Lyrics that relate to the Israeli experience. As one might expect in a country that has faced major wars and military conflicts since its inception, army life and wars are common themes in Israeli songwriting. Very few of the war songs are marching songs, and none denigrate the Arab enemies.  Most are melancholy, focusing on separation and loss during war, and the longing for peace. Many songs are about pioneering, building up the land, and love of hiking and nature. Others are based on biblical texts. A typical pioneer marching song is Anu Nihiyeh HaRishonim (We will be the first), with words by Yosef Haftman to a traditional melody.

 A distinctive vocal style.  Israeli singers – especially those of Yemenite origin or who specialize in more middle eastern style songs – tend to sing with a guttural, throaty enunciation.  A folk legend contends that these singers would drink water from goatskin watersacks, and the hairs of the goat would stick in their throats. An example of this style can be heard in the song Ein Adir KeAdonai, (There is none so great as God), a traditional liturgical melody sung by Bracha Zefira.

Early history

The first efforts to create a corpus of music suitable for a new Jewish entity that would eventually become Israel were in 1882. This was the year of the First Aliyah, the first wave of Jewish immigrants seeking to create a national homeland in Palestine.  As there were no songs yet written for this national movement, Zionist youth movements in Germany and elsewhere published songbooks, using traditional German and other folk melodies with new words written in Hebrew.  An example of this is the song that became Israel's national anthem, "Hatikvah". The words, by the Hebrew poet Naftali Herz Imber, express the longing of the Jewish people to return to the land of Zion.  The melody is a popular eastern European folk melody.

In 1895 settlers established the first Jewish orchestra in Palestine. The orchestra was a wind band, located in the town of Rishon LeZion, and played light classics and marches.

Avraham Zvi Idelsohn, a trained cantor from Russia and a musicologist, settled in Jerusalem in 1906, with the objective of studying and documenting the musics of the various Jewish communities there.  At the time, there were a number of Jewish enclaves in Jerusalem, for Yemenites, Hassids, Syrians and other Jewish ethnic groups.  Idelsohn meticulously documented the songs and musical idioms of these groups. He also made the first efforts to bring these songs to the attention of all Jewish settlers, with the aim of creating a new Jewish musical genre.

Idelsohn was joined in Palestine by a few more classically trained musicians and ethnomusicologists, including Gershon Ephros in 1909 and, later, Joel Engel in 1924.  Like Idelsohn, Engel worked to disseminate traditional ethnic tunes and styles to the general Jewish public of Palestine.

The Second Aliyah, beginning in 1904, saw an increase in composition of original songs by Jewish settlers in Palestine. Among the earliest composers of folk songs were Hanina Karchevsky ("BeShadmot Beit Lehem"), and David Ma'aravi ("Shirat Hanoar").

Over the next 30 years, Jewish composers in Palestine began to seek new rhythmic and melodic modes that would distinguish their songs from the traditional European music they had been brought up on. Leaders of this musical movement were Matityahu Shelem ("VeDavid Yefe Eynaim", "Shibbolet Basadeh"), Yedidia Admon ("Shadmati"), and others.  These composers sought to imitate the sounds of Arabic and other Middle Eastern music.  They used simple harmonies, and preferred the natural minor to melodic and harmonic minors used by European music.  They especially eschewed the interval of the augmented second, part of the "gypsy minor" scale used typically in klezmer music. "Its character is depressing and sentimental", wrote music critic and composer Menashe Ravina in 1943.  "The healthy desire to free ourselves of this sentimentalism causes many to avoid this interval."

Some musicians of the period, like Marc Lavry ("Shir Ha-Emek", "Kitatenu Balayla Tzoedet"), wrote in both the new Hebrew style and the European style in which they were trained. For example, "Zemer" is a song in the new style; Dan HaShomer is an opera in the European classical tradition. Others, like Mordechai Zeira, lamented the fact that they did not write in the new Hebrew mold.  Zeira, one of the most prolific and popular composers of the period ("Hayu Leylot", "Layla Layla", "Shney Shoshanim"), referred to his inability to write in the new style as "the Russian disease".

Emanuel Zamir worked in the 40s and 50s in a genre known as "shirei ro'im" (shepherd songs). He combined Bedouin music with Biblical-style lyrics, often accompanied by the recorder.

Music as a nation builder 
The movement to create a repertoire of Hebrew songs, and specifically a distinctive musical style for those songs, was seen not merely as a creative outlet, but as a national imperative. This imperative – which influenced the literature, theater and graphic arts of the period as well as music – was to seek cultural roots of the new Israeli nation in the culture of the ancient Hebrews of the Bible.  The characteristics of the new Hebrew style, contended composer Yitzhak Edel, are "remnants of ancient Hebrew music that have struggled to survive the years of diaspora... the primitive life of our settlers, who broke away from the European civilization, sought a musical expression that would suit their world view."

In light of the national importance of creating a new Hebrew repertoire, the effort received support of national institutions.  The Histadrut Labor Union, which, prior to the founding of the state of Israel served many of the functions of a government, created the "Merkaz LeTarbut" (Cultural Center), which published many songbooks, and subsidized the composition of works by Hebrew composers. Public singalongs were actively encouraged. The kibbutz movements distributed songsters and established the singalong as a central daily event in kibbutz life.  Public singalongs were also seen as a way of teaching Hebrew to new immigrants from Europe and, later, from Middle Eastern countries.

The state radio has also been a powerful force in promoting the Hebrew song.  Until 1990, all radio and television stations were government owned and controlled.  As such, they were leading arbiters of taste in Palestine and later in Israel.  "... the stations perceived it their duty to initiate special projects for the preservation of the Israeli song heritage and to encourage the writing and recording of 'authentic' music."
According to Netiva Ben-Yehuda, linguist and music historian, youths carried notebooks to jot down the songs they would sing with their friends.

This view—that Israeli music is a defining element in the creation of Israeli culture—continues to this day, and influences artists in all musical genres—pop, rock, and classical.

Musical cabarets 

Starting in the 1920s, café and cabaret music became popular in Palestine, and became an important formative force in Israeli music. Before the establishment of the state, there were three leading cabarets – HaKumkum (The Kettle), HaMetate (The Broom), and Li-La-Lo. These cabarets staged variety shows that combined political satire, drama and song.

The cabarets were launching pads for the careers of some of Israel's leading popular music stars: Shoshana Damari, who popularized Yemenite-style singing worldwide, started performing as a teenager at Li-La-Lo; Yafa Yarkoni also started as a cabaret singer.  Composers Nahum Nardi ("Shtu HaAdarim", "Kahol Yam HaMayim"), Moshe Vilensky ("BeKhol Zot Yesh Ba Mashehu", "Hora Mamtera"), Daniel Sambursky ("Shir HaEmek", "Zemer HaPlugot"), and others created songs that became part of the canonical Israeli repertoire. Poet Nathan Alterman wrote many of the lyrics.

The cabarets also contributed to diversity in Israeli music.  Many of the songs were in a popular, light style, distinct from the New Hebrew style or the Russian folk style that was prevalent. Many songs were in the major key rather than minor, had upbeat rhythms and included tangos, sambas and other Latin styles.

Cabarets and musical reviews continued after the establishment of the state of Israel in 1948.

Aliyah of musicians in the 1930s 
The rise of Nazism in Europe forced many Jewish musicians to leave.  Some of these musicians came to Israel.  The immigration included some of the leading classical musicians of Europe, including Ödön Pártos, concertmaster of the Berlin Philharmonic, Paul Ben-Haim, composer and opera conductor, and composer Alexander Boskovitz.

Just as writers of popular music sought a new Hebrew style, many classical composers sought new modes of composition that would give expression to their new national identity.  "... One cannot continue in this country writing works which are based on purely western concepts", wrote music critic David Rosolio in 1946.  "The landscape, the lifestyle, the environment, all require a change and fundamentally different approach." Boskovitz in his "Semitic Suite" for piano (1945) writes in a homophonic style with a drone accompaniment and repeated notes, imitating the sound of the Arabic oud and kanun.  Ben-Haim wrote "Sonata A Tre" for cembalo, mandolin and guitar (1968), which also has a distinctly Middle Eastern sound.

Israel Philharmonic Orchestra 

By 1935, Jewish musicians throughout Europe were faced with dismissal, persecution, and expulsion.  To meet the pressing need to rescue these musicians, concert violinist Bronislaw Huberman decided to form an orchestra in Palestine – both as a safe haven and as a unique musical endeavor.  Huberman recruited musicians from Europe's leading orchestras, and the Palestine Philharmonic made its debut in December 1936, under the baton of Arturo Toscanini. The Israel Philharmonic Orchestra has been a leading force in Israeli music and culture.  It has debuted many works by Israeli composers, and has helped launch the careers of many Israeli musicians. The orchestra has played a number of concerts that have had historic significance for Israel.  In 1967, immediately after the 1967 war, conductor Leonard Bernstein led the orchestra on a tour to the Sinai desert, the site of fighting only days before.  The symphony also performed on the Lebanese border in the 1980s, playing to an audience of mixed Israelis and Lebanese who gathered on both sides of the border fence to listen. Music director Zubin Mehta, though not himself an Israeli, speaks some Hebrew and is an important figure in the Israeli musical scene.

Music and the military 

The military establishment in Israel, and the role of the military in Israeli culture, have been decisive influences on Israeli music.

In the wake of decades of conflict with the Arabs, the themes of war and peace have become an integral part of Israeli music.  From pre-state times until the present day, many songs deal with war, sacrifice, loss, heroism, and the longing for peace.  Extremely militaristic songs that glorify triumph over the enemy are not the standard in the Israeli repertoire.  Rather, most songs dealing with war are melancholy in tone.  An extreme example is the song "Eliphelet": to a halting melody in a minor key by Sasha Argov, the song (lyrics by Natan Alterman) tells of a boy "without a penny's worth of character", who is killed in combat for an unthinking error of judgment.

The influence of the military on Israeli music, however, goes far beyond its being a source of inspiration for songs.  The military establishment has been an active promoter of music, through its corps of military performance groups, and through its army-run radio station, Galei Tsahal.

Since the 1950s, the Israel Defense Forces (IDF) has run performing groups called Lehakot Tsva'iyot (Army Ensembles).  These groups, comprising enlisted soldiers with talent or performing experience, tour bases and field positions to entertain the troops.  Performing original materials meticulously prepared and performed, these groups became leaders in the Israeli music and entertainment field.  Many of Israel's most popular songs were written for the Lehakot Tsva'iyot – for example, "Dina Barzilai" (words: Haim Hefer, music: Sasha Argov), "Halleluya" (words and music: Yair Rosenblum), "Yeshnan Banot" (words: Yoram Tahar-Lev, music: Yair Rosenblum). Dubi Zeltzer, considered one of the founding fathers of Israeli pop music, wrote many of the songs for the Nahal Brigade entertainment troupe.

The Lehakot Tsva'iyot were incubators for performers and composers who, from the 1960s to the present, have become Israel's stars.  Among the artists who began their careers in the Lehakot are Arik Einstein, Chava Alberstein, the members of Kaveret, Yehoram Gaon, Nehama Hendel, Yisrael Borochov, Yardena Arazi, Shlomo Artzi, Etti Ankri, and David D'Or.  Composers and lyricists who made their names writing material for the Lehakot include Naomi Shemer, Yohanan Zarai, Yoni Rechter, Nurit Hirsh, and Yair Rosenblum.

Galey Tsahal, the IDF-run radio station, has been a force in promoting original Israeli music. Galey Tsahal began broadcasting in 1950.  It devoted much of its broadcast time to popular music.

The music of the Lehakot and of Galey Tsahal was not specifically military music; most of the songs produced and broadcast were general songs.  However, the IDF did see music as an important propaganda tool, and actually sponsored the composition of songs on subjects it deemed important.  For example, lyricist Haim Hefer was invited to spend a week accompanying the elite commando group "Haruv", and to base a song on his experience.  The result was "Yesh Li Ahuv BeSayeret Haruv" (I have a lover in the Haruv commando unit) (music: Yair Rosenblum).

One of these groups, From Israel with Love, went on a world tour. Performing for sold-out crowds all over the United States with a tour planned for Europe. Ultimately the 1972 group was broken up early due to Munich massacre during the 1972 Summer Olympics.

1967 as a turning point 
The 1967 war marked an important turning point in Israeli culture.  In the words of Amos Elon, "in the Six Day War of 1967, the Israeli people came of age... it marked the transition from adolescence to maturity." The period after the war saw a burgeoning of cultural activity – within a few years, the number of art galleries increased by a third, the number of theaters doubled, and a proliferation of restaurants, night clubs, and discothèques opened.  Economic growth went from 1 percent per annum before the war to 13 percent the following year.

The Israeli music scene opened up to the rest of the world.  Rock music, which prior to the war had almost no audience and was almost never played on the state radio, started drawing audiences. Muzika Mizrahit, the underground style of popular music enjoyed by Israelis of Sephardic origin, gradually gained legitimacy and recognition.  Israeli musicians performed abroad with increasing frequency, and European and American musicians came to Israel to perform.

In this growth of diversification, much Israeli music lost its national flavor, and became largely inspired by international styles.  The Israeli preoccupation with defining a national style faded. "I don't like the attempt to be ethnic very much", said rock musician Shalom Hanoch in an interview.  "I don't search for roots [in my music], my roots are within me... I don't have to add oriental flavor for people to know that I am from the Middle East."

Nonetheless, many Israeli musicians, both popular and classical, continued to be concerned with defining a distinctly national identity in their music.

Evolution of the music industry
Starting in 1967, the productions of the Lehakot Tzva'iyot became much more elaborate, and for the next five years these groups played a defining role in Israeli music.  However, in the 1980s the Lehakot started to decline, until they were discontinued altogether. Taking their place as a breeding ground for new musical talent were the two classical music academies in Israel – The Rubin Academy in Jerusalem and the Buchmann-Mehta School of Music in Tel Aviv – as well as two private schools that teach mostly jazz and popular music (The Rimon school in Ramat Hasharon and the Hed school in Tel Aviv).

Until the end of the 1980s, the Israeli government, primarily through its control of radio and television, continued to play a central role in shaping the musical tastes of Israelis.  In 1965, a feud between rival concert promoters was behind conservative forces in the government that refused to allocate foreign currency to pay for the Beatles to play in Israel. Some rock and Muzika Mizrahit artists complained that the radio and television discriminated against their music, preventing the commercial success of these increasingly popular genres.

With the commercialization of Israeli radio and television in the 1990s, the hegemony of the state-run media as arbiters of musical taste declined.  In their place, recording companies, impresarios and clubs became increasingly important in finding new talent and advancing careers, in a manner more typical of European and American industries.

Song contests 

From 1960 to 1980, Israeli radio and television promoted music by running frequent song contests.  Success in a song contest was often the key to success for an artist in those days.

Although geographically not in Europe, Israel is within the European Broadcasting Area and is a member of the European Broadcasting Union, and can thus participate in the Eurovision Song Contest. Israel made its first appearance there in 1973 and quickly found success in 1978, when the Israeli song "A-Ba-Ni-Bi", sung by Izhar Cohen and Alphabeta, with words by Ehud Manor and music by Nurit Hirsh, won first place. Israel won first place again the following year with "Hallelujah" (lyrics: Shimrit Or, music: Kobi Oshrat), performed by Milk and Honey), in 1998 with "Diva" (lyrics: Yoav Ginai, music: Svika Pick), performed by Dana International, and for the fourth and last time in 2018, when Netta Barzilai sang "Toy" (lyrics and music: Doron Medalie and Stav Beger) and won with 529 points.

Popular genres

Early Israeli rock 

From pre-1967 beginnings in marginal clubs in Tel Aviv, Israeli rock music has grown to a musical force worldwide.  With hundreds of bands, dozens of clubs, and many star performers, Israeli rock has grown to be "the dominant music culture in Israel."

The first successful rock group in Israel was "The Churchills", formed in 1967 by guitarists Haim Romano and Yitzhak Klepter.  Singer Arik Einstein, a graduate of the Lehakot Tzva'iyot and a rising star in the Israeli music world, chose them as his backup group in 1969, and together they were the first group to offer a publicly acceptable rock sound.

In the 1970s, the Israeli rock idiom was developed by:

 Svika Pick, first Israeli rocker to appear in punk and glam-style outfits
 Shmulik Kraus, Josie Katz and Arik Einstein who banded together to form the trio "Hahalonot Hagvohim" (the High Windows).
 Kaveret, with singer Gidi Gov and guitarist and composer Danny Sanderson. Kaveret, formed in 1972, was instant success.  Songs from their album "Sippurei Poogy" (Stories of Poogy) are still played on Israeli radio today.
 Shalom Hanoch, composer, guitarist and singer. The album "Sof Onat Hatapuzim" (The end of the Orange Season), of his songs, was released in 1976. It had the hardest rock sound of any group yet, and is considered a landmark in Israeli rock history.

Progressive rock and folk 

Alongside the development of Israeli rock music, the tradition of the folk style continued. Singers like Chava Alberstein, Yehoram Gaon and Naomi Shemer continued to write and perform songs in the canonical "Land of Israel" style.  Naomi Shemer's songs, including "Yerushalayim Shel Zahav" (Jerusalem of Gold), "Hoy Artsi Moladeti" (Oh my Land My Homeland, lyrics Shaul Tchernichovsky), "Horshat HaEkaliptus" (The Eucalyptus Grove), have become icons in the patriotic repertoire. Much of her success, including "Yerushalaim Shel Zahav", was due to the song contests of the time.

Bridging the parallel developments of Israeli rock and the continuation of the Land of Israel tradition was a group of musicians who sought to create an authentic Israeli style that would incorporate elements of the new rock sound. These artists include Yehudit Ravitz, Yoni Rechter, Shlomo Gronich, Matti Caspi, as well as rock pioneers Gidi Gov, Danny Sanderson and Arik Einstein. Their style of progressive rock often adopted the lyrical ballad style of the canonical repertoire, and mixed traditional instruments—flute and recorder, darbuka, and acoustical guitar—with electric guitars, trap sets and synthesizers. Unlike typical hard rock, with its repetitive common-time rhythms and straightforward chord progressions, the songs of these artists were often complex rhythmically and harmonically. Matti Caspi's song "Noah", for example, has a Latin feel, with strong jazz-like offbeats, chromatic harmonic accompaniments, and words relating to the biblical story of Noah. David Broza made flamenco style music popular in the late 70s and 80s.

Rock was something of a musical revolution for Israel.  However, unlike the rock music of America in the 1960s and 1970s, it was not always an expression of social revolution. Israeli rock, up until 1985, with the appearance of Aviv Gefen, almost never dealt with the themes of drugs, sex, youthful anger and alienation (though Arik Einstein's "Shuv Lo Shaket" is an exception), and revolution. Its stars, with the exception of Shalom Hanoch and Svika Pick, were clean-cut Israelis, mostly with neatly trimmed hair, who had served in the army and were exemplary citizens.

Aviv Gefen changed that.  Starting his career at age 17, Gefen appeared on stage in drag and heavy makeup, bragged about his evasion of the draft, and sang about drugs, sex and alienation in a hard-rock style reminiscent of Punk Rock.  His music struck a deep chord among Israeli youth. He also symbolised the break with the old traditions, though his Beatles and Pink Floyd influenced music was in no sharp contrast stylistically to that of his father, Yehonatan Geffen, one of the leading lyricists of the day.
Aviv Gefen is still considered as one of Israel's biggest selling contemporary male artist today, though his style and early provocative appearance has dramatically mellowed in recent years.

Israeli pop and dance music 

Since 1980, the number of Israeli groups has multiplied, with hundreds of groups singing in all modern styles.  Leading performers have included the internationally acclaimed singer Ofra Haza (singer of "Im Nin'Alu", from the album Shaday [1988]), Berry Sakharof, often referred to as "The Prince of Israeli Rock"; Rami Fortis, the groups "Efo HaYeled?" (Where is the Child?), "Ethnix", "Teapacks", "Tislam", "Mashina", "Zikney Tzfat" (The Elders of Safad), "Rockfour", "HaMakhshefot" (The Witches), "Mofa Ha'arnavot Shel Dr. Kasper" (Dr. Kasper's Rabbits Show), Monica Sex and Shimron Elit ("20:20").

Singers who mix rock and pop elements with the traditional songs of the Land of Israel are usually achieving tremendous popularity and considered as leading acts in Israeli music today, singers such as Rita, Shlomo Artzi, Achinoam Nini, Ivri Lider, Aviv Gefen, Dana Berger, Evyatar Banai, Harel Skaat, Ninet Tayeb, Shiri Maimon, Dana International, Sharon Haziz, Mika Karni Roni Duani, David D'or, Metropolin and many more. Most of these artists also like to mix some elements of electronic sounds of dance music, so you can find style influences of pop icons such as Madonna and Kylie Minogue in Israeli music as well.

Jazz
In 2012 and 2013, the American Society of Composers, Authors and Publishers named Israeli musician Uri Gurvich as the best up-and-coming jazz composer.

Israeli world music
Yisrael Borochov works in the genres of world and Middle Eastern music in Israel, imbuing Israeli music with Arabic and Bedouin influences. He also runs the East West House, where some of the country's youngest talents come to play their esoteric ethnic music in the eclectic and mixed Jewish and Arabic environment of Jaffa.. The Idan Raichel Project is a collection of music from all around the world, such as Ethiopia, Germany, Portugal, as well as other Middle Eastern countries, in which songs are often sung in multiple languages.

Psychedelic trance, electronic and house music 

Psychedelic trance is popular in Israel, and some Israeli trance (including Goa trance and nitzhonot) artists have gained international recognition, among them Alien Project, Astrix, Astral Projection, Maor Levi, Vini Vici, Zafrir and Infected Mushroom. Offer Nissim is one of the most internationally acclaimed contemporary house music producers.

Rap and hip hop 

Israel has developed its own brand of rap and hip hop with groups such as Hadag Nahash, Subliminal, Sagol 59 and Kele 6 performing Israeli hip hop.

Heavy metal 
Israel has a small underground metal scene, as shown in the documentary Global Metal. Though some heavy metal in Israel is seen as Satanic, Salem and Melechesh have overcome controversy and become well known in the extreme metal underground.

Classical music 
After 1967, classical composers in Israel continued their quest for an Israeli identity in art music.  Some Israeli composers have chosen explicitly Jewish or Middle Eastern materials for their compositions.

 Leon Schidlowsky, was born in Chile and settled in Israel in 1969, when he was 38 years old. Many of his compositions are inspired by Jewish themes, including the Holocaust, without forgetting his Latin American origin. Several of his symphonic works have been premiered by the Israel Philharmonic. Schidlowsky was a professor at the Tel Aviv University.
 Betty Olivero uses melodies and modes from her Sephardic Jewish background, building layers of overtones and pantonal harmonies on top of them, so the effect is at the same time very dissonant yet clearly familiar.  Despite its modernity, her music has a distinctly Sephardic and tonal character.  An example is  "Achot Ketana", based on a 13th-century Sephardic prayer, and quoting from a Bach chaconne.
 Tsippi Fleischer sets classical poetry in Arabic, Ugarith, and other languages to contemporary music.  She uses many features of Arabic music in her compositions, including the use of maqamat, with complex microtonic intonation, combined with traditional Arabic, Western classical and modern instrumentation.  An example is "The Goddess Anath", based on scripts in Ugarith, a composition in multimedia for woman's voice, violin, piano, percussion and dancer.
 Andre Hajdu, an immigrant from Hungary, has arranged Hassidic tunes for jazz ensemble.
 Mark Kopytman, a Russian immigrant, has composed symphonic and chamber works based on Jewish themes.  An example is his composition "Memory" for string orchestra, which recalls the klezmer music of Eastern Europe.

Other Israeli composers of note, including Noam Sherif, Ami Maayani, Yehezkel Braun, and Zvi Avni, have also used Jewish and Israeli themes in their compositions. A new generation of composers includes Yitzhak Yedid, Lior Navok, Gilad Hochman.

In addition to the Israel Philharmonic, a number of other Israeli orchestras have achieved renown.  These include the Jerusalem Symphony Orchestra, which is supported by the state radio and television authority; the Rishon LeZion Orchestra, and the Camerata Orchestra.  One of the motivations for creating these orchestras was to provide employment for Russian immigrant musicians, who arrived in Israel with a high professional level but could not find jobs in their field.

The New Israel Opera Company was founded in 1985.  This was the first successful attempt to establish a permanent repertory opera, after a series of failed attempts starting in the 1940s In 1995, the Opera moved into a permanent home in the Golda Center in Tel Aviv.

Israel has produced some of the world's leading performers and conductors.  These include pianist and conductor Daniel Barenboim, conductor Eliahu Inbal and a large number of violinists, among them Itzhak Perlman, Pinchas Zukerman, Gil Shaham, Ivry Gitlis, Gil Shohat and Shlomo Mintz.

The Jerusalem Quartet is a string quartet that has achieved international acclaim.  Other leading chamber groups include the Jerusalem Trio, the Tel Aviv Soloists, the Carmel Quartet and the Aviv Quartet.

Mizrahi music

Israeli immigrant communities from Arab countries have over the last 50 years created a blended musical style that combines Turkish, Greek, Arabic, and Israeli elements.  As opposed to the New Hebrew Style, which was the conscious creation of Eastern European immigrants trying to define their new Israeli identity, the Muzika Mizrahit style is truly spontaneous and indigenous. Initially met with hostility by the mainstream cultural institutions of Israel, it has now become a major force in Israeli culture.

The Muzika Mizrahit movement started in the 1950s with homegrown performers in the ethnic neighborhoods of Israel – the predominantly Yemenite "Kerem Hatemanim" neighborhood of Tel Aviv, Moroccan neighborhoods and neighborhoods of Iranian and Iraqi immigrants – who played at weddings and other events. They performed songs in Hebrew, but in a predominantly Arabic style, on traditional instruments – the Oud, the Kanun, and the darbuka. Jo Amar and Filfel al-Masry, were two early proponents of Moroccan and Egyptian extraction. In the 1960s, they added acoustic guitar and electric guitar, and their sound became more eclectic.  Vocalists typically decorated their singing with melisma and other oriental-style ornaments, and delivery was often nasal or guttural in character.  Intonation was typically Western, however; singers did not use the quartertone scales typical of Arabic music.

Lyrics were originally texts taken from classic Hebrew literature, including liturgical texts and poems by medieval Hebrew poets.  Later they added texts by Israeli poets, and began writing original lyrics as well. An example is the song "Hanale Hitbalbela" (Hannale was confused), sung by Izhar Cohen.  The lyrics are by the modern Hebrew poet and lyricist Natan Alterman, to a traditional tune.

In the 1970s and early 1980s, a few of these performers began distributing their songs on cassette tapes.  The tapes were an instant hit.  They were sold in kiosks in the rundown shopping area around the Tel Aviv bus station, and the music became known derogatorily as "Muzikat Kassetot", cassette music, or "Bus station music".  Performers during this period included Shimi Tavori, Zehava Ben and Zohar Argov, whose song "HaPerah BeGani" (the Flower in my Garden) became a major hit. Argov, a controversial character who died in 1987 by suicide while in jail, became known as the "King of Muzika Mizrahit"; he became a folk hero, and a movie was made of his life.

Despite the obvious popularity of this music, the state radio eschewed Muzika Mizrahit almost entirely.  "The educational and cultural establishment made every effort to separate the second generation of eastern immigrants from this music, by intense socialization in schools and in the media", wrote the social researcher Sami Shalom Chetrit.

The penetration of Muzika Mizrahit into the Israeli establishment was the result of pressure by Mizrahi composers and producers such as Avihu Medina, the overwhelming, undeniable popularity of the style, and the gradual adoption of elements of Muzika Mizrahit by mainstream artists.  Yardena Arazi, one of Israel's most popular stars, made a recording in 1989 called "Dimion Mizrahi" (Eastern Imagination), and included original materials and some canonic Israeli songs.  Also, some performers started developing a fusion style of Muzika Mizrahit, Israeli, Greek, rock, and other styles.  These included Ehud Banai, Yehuda Poliker, and Shlomo Bar, whose group "HaBrera HaTivit" (The Natural Choice, or the Natural Selection) incorporated Sitars, tabla, and other Indian instruments to create a new, "World" style.

The acceptance of Muzika Mizrahit, over the 1990s, parallels the social struggle of Israelis of Mizrahi origin to achieve social and cultural acceptance. "Today, the popular Muzika Mizrahit has begun to erase the differences from rock music, and we can see not a few artists turning into mainstream... This move to the mainstream culture includes cultural assimilation", writes literary researcher and critic Mati Shmuelof.

Hassidic and Orthodox Jewish music 
The Orthodox Jewish community of Israel, and its parallel community in the United States, have developed a unique form of Hassidic rock, which has become popular throughout the young orthodox community.  This musical form combines the sonorities, instrumentation and rhythms of rock music with melodies which are in a klezmer style, and words taken mostly from religious texts.  This rather anomalous combination is produced, performed and broadcast in nearly complete segregation from secular Israeli music.  It is never heard on secular radio stations, or in secular public performances.  It is broadcast on religious radio stations and played at religious events.

One of the pioneers of Hassidic rock was the "singing rabbi," Shlomo Carlebach, who developed a large following in New York in the 1960s, singing religious songs in a folk style reminiscent of Peter, Paul and Mary. Israeli Hassidic rock performers include the group Reva L'Sheva and singers Adi Ran and Naftali Abramson.  Because of an halakhic restriction on women singing to mixed audiences, there are no women in Hassidic rock groups. Concerts will usually be gender segregated.

While the style is embraced enthusiastically by the religious Zionist movement, including Gush Emunim, it is not without its opponents within the Haredi community. Some Haredi rabbis have "a hard time with someone screaming out 'Yes, there's the Holy One, blessed be He' at the top of his lungs all of a sudden", says Kobi Sela, religious music critic. Religious singer-songwriter Ishay Ribo, who pens original lyrics on themes such as spirituality, faith, and God, has built large fan bases among both religious and secular audiences due to the quality of his music and his artistic expression.

Israeli Arab music 

The Arab community in Israel, comprising 20 percent of Israel's permanent population at the end of 2007, has developed its own unique forms of musical expression.

Until the early 1990s, little original music was produced by this community and the focus was on the great stars of the Arab world – Umm Kulthum, Fairuz, Farid al-Atrash, and others.  Original local music did not achieve popularity or wide distribution among the local population until the 1980s. For the most part, local performers at weddings and other events played music written in Egypt, Lebanon, and Syria.

With the onset of the 21st century, local stars emerged, among them the internationally acclaimed oud and violin virtuoso Taiseer Elias, singer Amal Murkus, and brothers Samir and Wissam Joubran.  Israeli Arab musicians have achieved fame beyond Israel's borders: Elias and Murkus frequently play to audiences in Europe and America, and oud player Darwish Darwish (Prof. Elias's student) was awarded first prize in the all-Arab oud contest in Egypt in 2003.

Living as an Arab minority within Israel has been an influence on Israeli Arabs, which is reflected in their music.  Israeli Arab musicians are in the forefront of the quest to define their emerging identity.  Lyrics deal with issues of identity, conflict, remembrance and peace.  For example, Kamilya Jubran's song "Ghareeba", a setting of a poem by Khalil Gibran, deals with a sense of isolation and loneliness felt by the Arab Palestinian woman:

Several groups have emerged, such as Elias's Bustan Avraham,  The Olive Leaves, and Shlomo Gronich's Israeli-Palestinian ensemble in which Jews and Palestinians perform together, creating a fusion style of music. Joint musical bands such as Zimrat Yah, Shams Tishrin, Blues Job, and Sahar, appear all over Israel, particularly in the Galilee.The Olive Leaves gave a successful concert tour in Jordan in 1995, with lead singer Shoham Eynav (Jewish) singing songs in both Hebrew and Arabic.

Israeli Arabs have also branched out into other musical styles.  Palestinian hip-hop artist Tamer Nafar, founder of the rap group DAM, became an independent rap star after a politically charged dispute with Israeli rapper Subliminal. His music expresses the frustration and alienation that many Israeli-Palestinians feel.  The rock music of Basam Beromi, singer of the group "Khalas" (Enough!), protests against the strictures of traditional Arab society. The song "What have we come to?", for example, tells the story of a young girl in love, whose family murders her for violating strict traditional codes of courtship.  London-trained guitarist Michel Sajrawy combines jazz, rock, and gypsy with classical Arab music.

While music education for Israeli Arabs is less developed, there has been a steady growth of opportunities in this sector.  The Jerusalem Academy of Music and Dance has an advanced degree program, headed by Taiseer Elias, in Arabic music.  In 2007, the first precollege conservatory for the Arab-speaking population opened in Shfaram.

Iraqi Jewish music

The Iraqi Jews who immigrated to Israel in the early 1950s have preserved their own musical tradition. In the first half of the 20th century, almost all professional instrumental musicians in Iraq were Jewish. They played in the Imperial Orchestra, in the Baghdad radio orchestra, and in the nightclubs of Baghdad.  Leading performers included composer and Oud player Ezra Aharon, violinist Salih Al-Kuwaiti and his brother, oud player Dawud Al-Kuwaiti, composer Salim Al'Nur, singer Salima Pasha, and others. Between 1949 and 1950, almost all these professional musicians fled Iraq for Israel. The Israel Broadcasting Authority (IBA) Arabic Orchestra was instrumental in sustaining their musical traditions in Israel.

Many of these musicians were forced to seek employment outside the music business, but they continued to perform in the community.  "Our musical tradition continues", said Suad Bazun, singer and daughter to a family of leading Iraqi musicians.  "Today the grandchildren and the great-grandchildren continue to fill their homes with the songs of Iraq."

Yiddish and Ladino music
 Yiddish and Ladino are enjoying a revival in Israel. A number of private language institutes and universities offer programs in these languages, which were the spoken languages of Jews of the Diaspora.  A Yiddish theater group, the YiddishShpiel, in Tel Aviv, offers popular musical shows.  Several leading Israeli artists have recorded songs in these languages, including an album in Ladino by Yehoram Gaon, and an album in Yiddish by Chava Alberstein.
Also, a number of new anthologies of Yiddish songs have been compiled, including a seven-volume anthology edited by Sinai Leichter, published by the Hebrew University in Jerusalem.

Music of migrant workers
In 2006, there were an estimated 165,000 migrant workers in Israel. They come from the Philippines, Thailand, India, China, Africa, Eastern Europe, and elsewhere.  Each community of migrant workers has its own musical culture.  A visitor to the neighborhood of the Central bus station in Tel Aviv will hear strains of popular music from Addis Ababa, Bangkok, and Manila.  Foreign workers also have their local popular music groups, that perform at parties and on holidays.

Internationally acclaimed Israeli singers and musicians 
 Etti Ankri – a singer-songwriter, and former Female Singer of the Year in Israel, has also performed in the United States, England, and India.  Ankri has been called a "rock genius", a "poet of Israeli spirituality," and "the contemporary voice of... Israel."
 Keren Ann – performs in France.
 Mike Brant
 Daliah Lavi - performed mainly in Germany, where she became one of the most popular and successful female singers.
 Hadag Nahash – As well as songs in Hebrew, Hadag Nahash has several songs in other languages, such as Arabic, French, and English. Hadag Nahash provided many songs for the Adam Sandler film, Don't Mess With The Zohan. Many of their songs are about peace, and "Zman Lehitorer (Time To Wake Up)" has been used as a memento song for movements.
 Hedva and David - A singing duo, comprising Hedva Amrani and David Rosenthal. In 1970, they won first place at the Yamaha Song Festival in Tokyo, Japan, with the song "I Dream of Naomi", which sold more than a million copies in its Japanese version, ナオミの夢 "Naomi no Yume." It was awarded a gold disc.
 David Broza - Recognized worldwide for his dynamic guitar performances and humanitarian efforts, Broza's signature sound brings together the influence of Spanish flamenco, American folk, rock and roll, and poetry. With over 40 albums released, many of which are multiplatinum, in English, Hebrew, and Spanish, Broza continues to tour globally both as a solo musician and with his various musical projects. He is also the founder of the non-profit One Million Guitars, which gives underprivileged schoolchildren around the world hand-crafted guitars and the foundation of a musical education.
 David Serero – An internationally renowned French opera singer, baritone, born in France from Israeli parents. David Serero has won recognition for his versatile repertoire from Opera to Broadway and to popular songs. He has starred in several Broadway musicals such as Man of La Mancha for which he has won an award for best performance as Don Quixote. David has also recorded a duet with legendary pop singer Jermaine Jackson on Autumn Leaves. Very active in concerts, for which David has already performed more than 600, the French baritone often performs in benefit of charities and in hospitals in Israel.
 David D'Or –  A countertenor, he has been Israel's Singer of the Year, and Israel's representative in the Eurovision Song Contest. By February 2008, nine of his albums had gone platinum. D'Or performs a wide variety of music, including pop, rock, dance music, world music, Israeli folk songs, classical, opera, baroque arias in the original Italian, klezmer, holy music, ancient chants, and Yemenite prayers. He has performed throughout Europe, Asia, and the US.
 Ofra Haza – Apart from her success in Israel, Haza was well known in Europe and North America in the 1980s and 1990s for her unique blend of Yemenite music and electronic dance sounds. She represented Israel in the 'Eurovision Song Contest' in 1983, and won second place with "Chai" (Alive). Haza collaborated with Iggy Pop, Paula Abdul, Sarah Brightman, and others. She played Yocheved in the Oscar-winning animation movie "The Prince of Egypt," and sang a song, "Deliver Us."
Yardena Arazi
 Dana International – She achieved fame in Europe and North America, and became a gay icon after winning the "Eurovision Song Contest" in 1998 with her song "Diva".
 Ishtar – (born Eti Zach), vocalist of the French dance music group Alabina.
 Yael Naïm – Her song "New Soul" was used by the Apple computer company in an advertising campaign. She was the first Israeli solo artist to have a top 10 hit in the United States. The song peaked at # 7 on the Billboard Hot 100.
 Achinoam Nini – Known outside of Israel as Noa, Nini sings in many languages and styles, but her signature sound is a mix of traditional Yemenite and modern Israeli music.
 Gene Simmons of Kiss, the popular American band from the 1970s, was born in Haifa.
Asaf Avidan
Netta Barzilai - Netta is the winner of the 2018 edition of HaKochav Haba, the reality show that determines Israel's next representative in the Eurovision Song Contest. on March 11, 2018 the song "Toy" was released, becoming very popular among Eurovision fans and eventually won the 2018 Eurovision contest.
Dennis Lloyd
Lola Marsh
Infected Mushroom
Minimal Compact

Music education 
Israel offers myriad opportunities to study music, from early childhood through adulthood.  Music education in Israel enjoys government support, a vestige from the pre-state days when musicmaking was seen as a tool for teaching Hebrew to new immigrants and building a national ethos.

The Israel Ministry of Education supports 41 music conservatories throughout the country. Conservatories offer programs for all ages.  One of the most notable of these is the Stricker Conservatory of Tel Aviv, which, besides offering lessons and courses, sponsors a number of concert series and master classes by visiting artists.

A number of institutions of higher education offer degrees in music and musicology. In addition to the two music academies in Tel Aviv and Jerusalem, both Tel Aviv University and the Hebrew University of Jerusalem offer advanced degrees in musicology. The Hebrew University is also home to the Jewish Music Research Center. Bar-Ilan University has BA, MA and PhD programs in musicology and a program in music therapy; in 2007, its Safed College opened a three-year program in ethnic music including Klezmer, Hassidic, Western and Eastern music styles. Levinsky College offers a teaching certificate of a BA degree in music education.

The Rimon School of Jazz and Contemporary Music, founded in 1985, is Israel's only school for jazz, R&B, bebop, rock, and pop music. Many of its graduates have gone on to become well-known music professionals and performers.

Music education does not end with degree programs. Israel offers numerous opportunities for adult musicians to continue learning and performing, even if they do not pursue this as a career. There are two organizations for amateur chamber music players – The Israel Chamber Music Club, for string players, and Yanshuf for wind players. There are more than 20 community orchestras scattered throughout Israel for amateur musicians.

Music and politics
Israel is a country deeply riven by political differences, and music has often become associated with different political factions. Gush Emunim supporters have taken a repertoire of old religious songs and invested them with political meaning.  An example is the song "Utsu Etsu VeTufar" (They gave counsel but their counsel was violated). The song signifies the ultimate rightness of those steadfast in their beliefs, suggesting the rightness of Gush Emunim's struggle against anti-settlement policy by the government.

In 1967 war, Israel annexed Arab neighborhoods surrounding Jerusalem, a move widely supported at the time, but which has engendered controversy since. A few weeks before the war, Naomi Shemer wrote Jerusalem of Gold, sung by Shuli Natan, extolling the beauties of Jerusalem. That song, and others by Naomi Shemer have become associated with those in Israel who believe that Israel has no obligation to forgo territories occupied in 1967.

In February 1994, Kach supporter Baruch Goldstein massacred 29 Arab worshipers in the Tomb of the Patriarchs in Hebron.  While the act was universally condemned by the Israeli establishment, some extremists praised it. See, for example, "HaTevach: Madrih Munahim", in Yediot Aharonot. After the massacre, members of the utra-right Kach movement adopted "Barukh HaGever", a song often played at Jewish weddings with its own line dance, because the Hebrew title can be interpreted as "Blessed be the Man" or "Baruch the Hero."

Minutes before Prime Minister Yitzhak Rabin was murdered at a political rally in November 1995, Israeli folk singer Miri Aloni sang the Israeli pop song Shir Lashalom (Song for Peace). This song, originally written in 1969 and performed extensively by the Lahaqot Tsvayiot at the time, has become one of the anthems of the Israeli peace camp.

During the Arab uprising known as the First Intifada, Israeli singer Si Heyman sang Yorim VeBokhim (Shoot and Weep) to protest Israeli policy in the territories. This song was banned briefly by the state-run radio, but later became popular.

Since the onset of the Oslo Process and, more recently, Israel's unilateral disengagement plan, protest songs became a major avenue for opposition activists to express sentiments. Songs protesting these policies were written and performed by Israeli musicians, such as Ariel Zilber, Shalom Flisser, Aharon Razel, Eli Bar-Yahalom, Yuri Lipmanovich, Ari Ben-Yam, and many others.

See also 
 Hatikvah
 Jewish music
 Israel Philharmonic Orchestra Foundation
 List of Israeli musical artists
 List of Jewish musicians
 List of music festivals in Israel
 List of songs about Jerusalem
 Greek music in Israel
 Society of Authors, Composers and Music Publishers in Israel

Bibliography
 Badley, Bill and Zein al Jundi (2000) "Europe Meets Asia" In Broughton, Simon and Ellingham, Mark with McConnachie, James and Duane, Orla (Ed.), World Music, Vol. 1: Africa, Europe and the Middle East, pp 391–395. Rough Guides Ltd, Penguin Books. 
 Ben Zeev, Noam, "Music from Two Worlds" (June 26, 2007), in Haaretz. Retrieved July 19, 2010.
 Ben Zeev, Noam, "Namal Musikali BeShefaram" (April 29, 2007), in Haaretz.
 Brinner, Benjamin (2009) "Playing Across A Divide: Israeli-Palestinian Musical Collaborations" (New York: Oxford University Press)
 Bin Nun, Sagi, "Kiss the Fat Woman Goodbye" (October 26, 2004), in Haaretz. Retrieved July 19, 2010.
 Bohlman, P.V. (1988) The Study of Folk Music in the Modern World (Indiana University Press).
 Blacking, John (1995) Music, Culture, and Experience (Chicago). 
 Chetrit, Sami Shalom (2004) HaMaavak HaMizrahi BeYisrael 1948–2003 (Tel Aviv: Ofakim).
 Dvori, Moshe (2006) "עמארה – עיר בין הדקלים" ("Amara: Ir Ben HaDekalim"; "Amara: City Among the Date Palms") (Tel Aviv: Ahital). Retrieved July 19, 2010.
 Edel, Itzhak (1946) "HaShir HaEretz-Yisraeli" ("The Songs of the Land of Israel) (Tel Aviv: Monograph published by Merkaz HaTarbut, Histadrut).
 Eliram, Talila, (1995) Shirei Eretz Israel (Songs of the Land of Israel) – the Creations and Meaning of a Popular Music Repertoire at the End of the 20th Century (Bar Ilan University, Thesis for MA).
 Elon, Amos (1971) The Israelis: Founders and Sons (Great Britain: Weidenfeld and Nicolson).
 Fleisher, Robert Twenty Israeli Composers (Detroit: Wayne State University Press, 1997).
 Gluzman, D. (1987) Ehad BaPe veEhad BaTslil ("One by Word and One by Tune") (Tel Aviv University, Thesis for MA).
 Hacohen, Eliahu (1998) Introduction to Layla Layla: The Songs of Mordechai Zeira, edited by Gil Aldema (Tel Aviv).
 Heskes, Irene (1994) Passport to Jewish Music (New York: Tara Publications). 
 Heyman, Nahum (2007) radio interview on Galei Tsahal, 25 May.
 Hirshberg, Jehoash (1995) Music in the Jewish Community of Palestine 1880–1948 (Oxford: Oxford University Press). 
 Idelsohn, A.Z. (1948) Jewish Music in its Historical Development (New York: Tudor Publishing).
 Israel Central Bureau of Statistics (2010), הירחון הסטטיסטי (Monthly Bulletin of Statistics) No. 6 / 2010. Retrieved July 19, 2010.
 Israeli Ministry of Foreign Affairs, Cultural and Scientific Affairs Division, "Extending the Olive Branch" (September 1995), Panim: Faces of Art and Culture in Israel. Retrieved July 19, 2010.
 Kinneret Publishing, 1000 Zemer VeOd Zemer (in three volumes) (Tel Aviv: 1981).
 Lynskey, Dorian "The Great Divide" (March 11, 2005) from The Guardian, London. Retrieved July 19, 2010.
 Kojaman, Yeheskel (1999) "Jewish Role in Iraqi Music" in The Scribe: Journal of Babylonian Jewry (Tel Aviv: The Exilarch Society), Volume 72, p 42. Retrieved July 19, 2010.
 Manasseh, Sara (2004) "An Iraqi samai of Salim Al-Nur" in Research Centre for Cross-Cultural Music and Dance Performance (London: Arts and Humanities Research Board), Newsletter 3, pp 7–8.  Retrieved July 19, 2010.
 Pasternak, Velvel compiler, editor and arranger, Israel in Song.  Tara Publications,1974. .
 Ravina, Menashe (1943), "Hashirim LeAm BeEretz Yisrael" (Tel Aviv: Monograph published by  Mossad LeMusica Ltd.)
 Regev Motti (1993), Oud and Guitar: The Musical Culture of the Arabs in Israel (Institute for Israeli Arab Studies, Beit Berl), .
 Regev, Motti and Seroussi, Edwin (2004) Popular Music and National Culture in Israel (Berkeley: University of California Press). 
 Reuters, "Factbox: Migrant Workers in Israel" (March 11, 2007). Retrieved July 19, 2010.
 Rosolio, David (1946), Review of the Semitic Suite by Alexander Boskovitz, Ha'aretz, March 1.
 Sela, Kobi (2007) "Hassidic Rock Around the Clock", Haaretz, March 5.
 Shahar, Natan (1999) "HaShir HaEretz-Yisraeli – Hithavuto, Tsmihato, VeHitPathuto BeShanim 1882–1948" in Zohar Shavit (editor), Bniata Shel Tarbut Ivrit BeEretz Yisrael
 Shmuelof, Mati (2006) "Reflections on Muzika Mizrahit"
 Solomon, Naomi, "HaBesora Al Pi Tel Aviv", (December 29, 2006) in Tel Aviv Magazine.
 Tahar-Lev, Yoram and Naor, Mordecai (1992) Shiru Habitu Ur'u – The Stories Behind the Songs (Tel Aviv: Ministry of Defence). 
 Toeplitz, Uri Sippura Shel HaTizmoret HaPhilharmonit HaYisraelit (Tel Aviv: Sifriat HaPoalim, 1992) – history of the Israel Philharmonic Orchestra (in Hebrew)
 The Marc Lavry Heritage Foundation

References

Sources for songs

External links 

 BBC Radio 3 Audio (60 minutes): Mount Tabor and the Sea of Galilee. Accessed November 25, 2010.
 BBC Radio 3 Audio (60 minutes): The Dead Sea Festival and Sephardic song. Accessed November 25, 2010.
 BBC Radio 3 Audio (60 minutes): Nazareth, the oud, and Dalal Abu Amana. Accessed November 25, 2010.
 BBC Radio 3 Audio (60 minutes): Jerusalem International Oud Festival 2008 – Part 1. Accessed November 25, 2010.
 BBC Radio 3 Audio (60 minutes): Jerusalem International Oud Festival 2008 – Part 2. Accessed November 25, 2010.
 BBC Radio 3 Audio (60 minutes): In Jerusalem: Dalal Abu Amneh and The Yonah Ensemble. Accessed November 25, 2010.
 TorahAndIsrael has links to well-known Israeli songs on YouTube, with links to their lyrics in Hebrew and English
 The Israel Music Institute and the Israel Composers League are the two unions for Israeli composers.  Sites offer musical biographies and sheet music.
 The Leading Alternative Hebrew Music Portal
 Tavim.net (Hebrew site) – Chords and Sheet Music for Israeli Songs
 Nostalgia (Hebrew site) – history of Israeli song with downloads of historic recordings in the public domain
 SongNet- lyrics of Israeli songs
 YouTunes – lyrics and clips of Israeli songs
 HebrewSongs.com
 Punkrock.co.il- Web E-zine dedicated to Israeli Punk Rock.
 Oded Zehavi,Wandering sands and roots, Eretz Acheret Magazine
 An interview (1963) with Israeli folksinger Eliezer Adoram on influences on Israeli folk music, on Alan Wasser's "Folk Music Worldwide" radio program.
 Free Israeli Music From YouTube (in French).
 The Marc Lavry Heritage Foundation

Israeli culture
Israeli music
Middle Eastern music
Articles containing video clips